Exeristeboda exeristis is a species of moth of the family Tortricidae. It is found in Australia, where it has been recorded from northern Queensland to New South Wales. The habitat consists of rainforests.

The wingspan is about 15 mm.

The larvae have been recorded feeding on Eucalyptus grandis. They join together leaves of their host plant and feed from within.

References

Moths described in 1910
Tortricini
Moths of Australia
Taxa named by Edward Meyrick